Ganske Verlagsgruppe (translated Ganske Publishing Group) is a German publishing holding company comprising eighteen distinct companies. The group is active mainly in book and magazine publishing with an emphasis on travel, gourmet, lifestyle, and architecture, orientated towards an upscale market. It has approximately 2,000 employees. The corporate headquarters are in Hamburg, with offices in Munich and several other cities.

Licensed versions of the group's magazines as well as corporate publishing products such as the BMW Magazine and the Relais & Chateaux Magazine are published throughout the world.

The group started avantgarde ventures such as the weekly newspaper Die Woche and monthly magazine TEMPO, breeding several well known journalists and experimenting with new styles that later became staples of the journalistic toolbox. Because of the group's upscale portfolio, reputation for innovation and high profitability it has been the target of several unsuccessful takeover attempts.

History 

In 1907, Richard Ganske established the magazine subscription service Lesezirkel daheim in Kiel, which would later become the current group of companies.

In 1938, the Lesezirkel maintained 30 outlets throughout Germany serving 180,000 customers. In 1941, Kurt Ganske – the son of the company's founder – invested in the Hoffmann und Campe Verlag in Hamburg. Nine years later, he took over the remaining shares of the publishing house. After his father's death in 1979, Thomas Ganske, the current owner, took on responsibility for the group. Thomas Ganske has gradually restructured the company since 1990. In 2001, these measures resulted in setting up the Ganske Verlagsgruppe as a holding company of which he became chief executive officer.

Business Units 
Book Publishing

 HOFFMANN UND CAMPE
 HOFFMANN UND CAMPE Corporate Publishing
 DEUTSCHER TASCHENBUCH VERLAG (dtv)
 GRÄFE UND UNZER
 TEUBNER
 HALLWAG
 GUINNESS WORLD RECORDS
 TRAVEL HOUSE MEDIA
 MERIAN Live!
 GUIDE MICHELIN
 Hatje Cantz Verlag

Magazine Publishing  (Jahreszeiten Verlag)

 FÜR SIE
 PETRA
 VITAL
 DER FEINSCHMECKER
 WEIN GOURMET
 MERIAN
 A&W Architektur & Wohnen
 COUNTRY
 ZUHAUSE WOHNEN
 SELBER MACHEN
 PRINZ

Electronic Publishing

 iPUBLISH
 MERIAN scout (navigation software)
 Kartographie
 Travel and Event Databases

Distribution / Retail / Hotel

 LESERKREIS DAHEIM
 PRESSE SERVICE GESELLSCHAFT
 WERBE MERKUR
 RHENANIA BUCHVERSAND
 AKZENTE VERSANDBUCHHANDLUNG
 Mail:Order:Kaiser
 FRÖLICH UND KAUFMANN Art Books
 HOTEL HOHENHAUS (a Relais & Chateaux member)

External links 
 Ganske Verlagsgruppe (Holding)
 Hoffmann und Campe
 Jahreszeiten Verlag
 Travel House Media
 Gräfe und Unzer
 iPublish
 Merian scout
 Hoffmann und Campe Corporate Publishing

Companies based in Hamburg
Book publishing companies of Germany
Mass media companies of Germany
Mass media in Hamburg